Cosmopterix geminella is a moth of the family Cosmopterigidae. It is known from Russia (Amur and Primorye regions).

References

geminella